Hero 420 is an Indo-Bangladesh romantic action film directed by Sujit Mondal and Saikat Nasir and produced by Abdul Aziz and Ashok Dhanuka under the banners of respectively Jaaz Multimedia and Eskay Movies. The soundtrack of the film is composed by Savvy Gupta. The film stars Om, Nusraat Faria Mazhar, and Riya Sen in lead role. The film was released on 19 February 2016. The film's motion poster was released on 27 December 2015. It is the remake of 2009 Telugu movie Maska.

Cast
 Om as Krish (India)
 Nusrat Faria as Rai (Bangladesh)
 Riya Sen as Riya (India)
 Ashish Vidyarthi as Rai / Riya's father
 Pradeep Rawat as Anukul Roy
 Ahmed Sharif
 Shimul Khan

Production
In September 2015, Jaaz Multimedia announced the project with Nusraat Faria Mazhar as the main female lead and Saikat Nasir. Later, Om was hired to play the lead male role, while Riya Sen will be seen playing a pivotal role in the film. The first phase of the shooting began in Hyderabad, followed by Bangkok, where a song was shot. The last phase of the film was filmed in Bangladesh. Movie's vital part shoot in Hyderabad and Bangladesh. Movie ready for coming in theaters.

Soundtrack

References

2016 films
2010s action comedy-drama films
2010s Bengali-language films
2016 romantic comedy-drama films
Bangladeshi action comedy-drama films
Bangladeshi romantic comedy-drama films
Films shot in Bangladesh
Films shot in Chittagong Division
Films shot in Dhaka
Films shot in Hyderabad, India
Films shot in Bangkok
Bengali-language Bangladeshi films
Bengali-language Indian films
Films scored by Savvy Gupta
Bengali remakes of Telugu films
Bangladeshi remakes of Indian films
2016 comedy films
2016 drama films
Bangladeshi remakes of Telugu films
Jaaz Multimedia films